Rank comparison chart of officers for air forces of Lusophone states.

Officers

References

Military ranks of Lusophone countries 
Military comparisons